The 21 cm Mörser M. 16 was a heavy howitzer used by Austria-Hungary during World War I. Skoda began design in 1915 for a wheeled howitzer that could be towed in a single load by a tractor. The first prototype wasn't satisfactory as it was too heavy and traversing was difficult due to the very high limber bar pressure. A second howitzer was delivered in mid-1917 that broke down into two loads for transport. This, at least, cured the traversing problem of the first weapon, as reported by the test battery assigned to the 11th Army.  In the meantime, however, a third prototype had been ordered as the M. 18 with a carriage based on that of the 30.5 cm Mörser M. 16 that would allow for full traverse at the price of more time needed to emplace the firing platform. It broke down into three loads for transport. No M. 18s were delivered by the end of the war, although Skoda built some modified versions as the M. 18/19 for the newly independent Republic of Czechoslovakia where they were known as the 21 cm Mozdir vz. 18. After the Occupation of Czechoslovakia in 1939 the Germans adopted them under the names of 21 cm Mörser 18/19(t) or kurze 21 cm Mörser(t) and used at least 15 on coast-defense duties in Norway.

The only known surviving piece at the National Military Museum, Romania.

Notes

References 

 Gander, Terry and Chamberlain, Peter. Weapons of the Third Reich: An Encyclopedic Survey of All Small Arms, Artillery and Special Weapons of the German Land Forces 1939-1945. New York: Doubleday, 1979 
 Ortner, M. Christian. The Austro-Hungarian Artillery From 1867 to 1918: Technology, Organization, and Tactics. Vienna, Verlag Militaria, 2007 

World War I howitzers
210 mm artillery
World War I artillery of Austria-Hungary